Robert James Kerr (born 4 April 1966) is a former New Zealand cricketer who played first-class and List A cricket for Wellington from 1993 to 1998.

Robbie Kerr was a middle-order batsman and occasional wicket-keeper who was a one-day specialist. He made his highest List A score of 61 when he won the man of the match award in Wellington's victory over Otago in 1993–94.

His daughters, Amelia and Jess Kerr, play for the New Zealand women's cricket team. His wife Jo, the daughter of the New Zealand Test batsman Bruce Murray, is a former member of the Wellington women's cricket team.

References

External links
 

1966 births
Living people
New Zealand cricketers
Wellington cricketers
Cricketers from Wellington City